Syuzan Margaryan  (born October 6, 1961), is an Armenian singer. In 2003, Margaryan was awarded with the title of Honored Artist of Armenia.

References

1961 births
Living people
21st-century Armenian women singers
20th-century Armenian women singers
Musicians from Yerevan
Armenian pop singers
Honored artists of Armenia